Forman is a city in and the county seat of Sargent County, North Dakota, United States. The population was 509 at the 2020 census. Forman was founded in 1883.

History
Forman was founded in 1883 by Cornelius Forman. In 1886, the county seat was transferred to Forman from Minor.

Until 1967, Forman was the only town in North Dakota, as all other incorporated communities were either villages or cities. It had become so by a special legal process. In that year it became a city, because the state legislature declared that all incorporated communities were to be cities without distinction of rank.

Geography and climate
Forman is located at  (46.105167, -97.637227).
The town surrounds a body of water known as Lake Lithia.

Demographics

2010 census
As of the census of 2010, there were 504 people, 222 households, and 123 families residing in the city. The racial makeup of the city was 98.6% White, 0.2% African American, 0.2% Native American, 0.2% Pacific Islander, 0.4% from other races, and 0.4% from two or more races. Hispanic or Latino of any race were 1.2% of the population.

There were 222 households, of which 23.9% had children under the age of 18 living with them, 48.6% were married couples living together, 4.1% had a female householder with no husband present, 2.7% had a male householder with no wife present, and 44.6% were non-families. 41.9% of all households were made up of individuals, and 25.2% had someone living alone who was 65 years of age or older. The average household size was 2.10 and the average family size was 2.87.

The median age in the city was 46.8 years. 22% of residents were under the age of 18; 4.2% were between the ages of 18 and 24; 22.7% were from 25 to 44; 24.5% were from 45 to 64; and 26.8% were 65 years of age or older. The gender makeup of the city was 50.8% male and 49.2% female.

2000 census
As of the census of 2000, there were 506 people, 221 households, and 129 families residing in the city. The population density was 719.2 people per square mile (279.1/km2). There were 256 housing units at an average density of 363.8 per square mile (141.2/km2). The racial makeup of the city was 97.63% White, 0.20% African American, 1.38% from other races, and 0.79% from two or more races. Hispanic or Latino of any race were 1.38% of the population.

There were 221 households, out of which 24.9% had children under the age of 18 living with them, 50.7% were married couples living together, 2.7% had a female householder with no husband present, and 41.6% were non-families. 39.4% of all households were made up of individuals, and 22.2% had someone living alone who was 65 years of age or older. The average household size was 2.16 and the average family size was 2.91.

In the city, the population was spread out, with 20.9% under the age of 18, 5.5% from 18 to 24, 20.8% from 25 to 44, 27.7% from 45 to 64, and 25.1% who were 65 years of age or older. The median age was 46 years. For every 100 females, there were 98.4 males. For every 100 females age 18 and over, there were 102.0 males.

The median income for a household in the city was $36,875, and the median income for a family was $48,929. Males had a median income of $37,583 versus $21,250 for females. The per capita income for the city was $20,206. About 6.5% of families and 10.0% of the population were below the poverty line, including 11.6% of those under age 18 and 14.0% of those age 65 or over.

References

External links
 Official website
Century of progress Forman, ND, 1884-1984 from the Digital Horizons website
Forman's diamond jubilee history, 1884-1959 : Forman, North Dakota, June 11-12-13 from the Digital Horizons website
Forman, North Dakota : community fact survey (1966) from the Digital Horizons website

Cities in North Dakota
Cities in Sargent County, North Dakota
County seats in North Dakota
Populated places established in 1883
1883 establishments in Dakota Territory